Poni is a village in Sikandarpur Karan block of Unnao district, Uttar Pradesh, India. It is connected to state highways and has 2 primary schools and no healthcare facilities. As of 2011, its population is 1,078, in 289 households.

The 1961 census recorded Poni (here spelled "Puni") as comprising 1 hamlet, with a total population of 598 (389 male and 209 female), in 96 households and 92 physical houses. The area of the village was given as 305 acres.

References

Villages in Unnao district